Simeen Hussain Rimi (born 19 August 1961) is a Bangladesh Awami League politician and the incumbent Jatiya Sangsad member representing the Gazipur-4 constituency. She was elected in the 10th Parliamentary Elections held on 5 January 2014 and in the 11th Parliamentary Elections on 31 December 2018. She is chairperson of the parliamentary standing committee of the Ministry of Culture. In November 2022, she became a member of Awami League Presidium.

Early life and education
Rimi was born in 1961 to Tajuddin Ahmad, the inaugural Prime Minister of Bangladesh, and Syed Zohra, another politician. Rimi has two sisters, Mahjabin Ahmad Mimi and Sharmin Ahmad Reepi, and a brother, Sohel Taj. She married Mushtaq Hussain.

Career
Rimi is the incumbent Jatiya Sangsad member from Gazipur-4 (Kapasia).

References

1961 births
Living people
People from Kapasia Upazila
Awami League politicians
9th Jatiya Sangsad members
10th Jatiya Sangsad members
11th Jatiya Sangsad members